Ruth Cameron is an American record producer and jazz vocalist.

Biography
Cameron came from a musical family, but first acted in theaters in North America and Europe. After marrying bassist Charlie Haden, she was his manager and co-produced many of his albums. Land of the Sun, a Haden album she co-produced, won the Grammy Award for Best Latin Jazz Album in 2005.

Cameron also studied singing. Her first recording was First Songs, for EmArcy Records, with Haden, drummer Larance Marable, and pianist Chris Dawson. Her second album, recorded in 1999 for Verve Records, was Roadhouse.

She was one of the vocalists on Haden's Sophisticated Ladies. She also appeared on the Haden family's bluegrass album, Rambling Boy. She sang in the UK in 2011.

Discography

As leader
Roadhouse (Verve, 1999)
First Songs (Emarcy, 1997)

As guest
Charlie Haden Sophisticated Ladies (EmArcy, 2011)
Charlie Haden Rambling Boy (EmArcy, 2008)

References

American women jazz singers
American jazz singers
Living people
Year of birth missing (living people)
Place of birth missing (living people)
American women record producers
21st-century American women